Stanley is a town in Page County, Virginia, United States.  The population was 1,689 at the 2010 census.

History
Fort Philip Long and Graves Chapel and Cemetery are listed on the National Register of Historic Places.

Geography
Stanley is located at  (38.577649, −78.508980).

According to the United States Census Bureau, the town has a total area of 1.1 square miles (2.8 km2), all of it land.

Transportation
The only primary highway directly serving Stanley is U.S. Route 340 Business, which is the main road northeast and southwest out of Stanley. To the northeast, US 340 Bus travels to Luray, rejoins U.S. Route 340, and continues northeast towards Front Royal. To the southwest, US 340 Bus rejoins US 340 and continues on to Shenandoah, Elkton and Waynesboro.

Demographics

As of the census of 2000, there were 1,326 people, 562 households, and 363 families living in the town. The population density was 1,203.8 people per square mile (465.4/km2). There were 598 housing units at an average density of 542.9 per square mile (209.9/km2). The racial makeup of the town was 97.89% White, 1.28% from other races, and 0.83% from two or more races. Hispanic or Latino of any race were 2.49% of the population.

There were 562 households, out of which 28.1% had children under the age of 18 living with them, 46.1% were married couples living together, 14.6% had a female householder with no husband present, and 35.4% were non-families. 31.3% of all households were made up of individuals, and 15.8% had someone living alone who was 65 years of age or older. The average household size was 2.36 and the average family size was 2.95.

In the town, the population was spread out, with 23.9% under the age of 18, 9.8% from 18 to 24, 28.0% from 25 to 44, 22.4% from 45 to 64, and 15.9% who were 65 years of age or older. The median age was 37 years. For every 100 females, there were 87.6 males. For every 100 females age 18 and over, there were 82.5 males.

The median income for a household in the town was $25,917, and the median income for a family was $33,188. Males had a median income of $24,706 versus $18,850 for females. The per capita income for the town was $13,082. About 12.1% of families and 16.6% of the population were below the poverty line, including 22.8% of those under age 18 and 25.2% of those age 65 or over.

Education

Public Schools 
Page County Public Schools serve Stanley, along with other residents of Page County.  Stanley Elementary serves the Stanley population with grades Pre-K through 5th grade.  Page County Middle School and Page County High School serves the remainder of the grade levels for the southern end of Page County.

Technical Schools 
Page County Technical Center, a part of Page County Public Schools system, serves adult and high school students with a variety of programs.

References

External links
 Town website

Towns in Page County, Virginia
Towns in Virginia